Ahmadabad-e Molla Mas (also Romanized as Aḩmadābād-e Mollā Mās; also known as Aḩmadābād) is a village in Dinavar Rural District, Dinavar District, Sahneh County, Kermanshah Province, Iran. At the 2006 census, its population was 152, in 35 families.

References 

Populated places in Sahneh County